Pagano is an Italian surname. Notable people with the name include:

 A. J. Pagano, American college football player
 Bartolomeo Pagano (1878–1947), Italian motion picture actor
 Biagio Pagano (born 1983), Italian footballer
 Cesare Pagano (born 1969), Italian Camorrista (mobster)
 Chuck Pagano (born 1960), American former National Football League head coach
 Chuck Pagano (ESPN), chief technology officer of ESPN
 Daniel Pagano (born 1953), American mobster
 Darlene Pagano, American lesbian feminist activist
 Ernest Pagano (1901–1953), American screenwriter
 Francesco Mario Pagano (1748–1799), Italian author and jurist
 Giuseppe Pagano (1896–1945), Italian architect
 John Pagano (born 1967), American National Football League coach
 Lindsay Pagano (born 1986), American singer
 Luca Pagano (born 1978), Italian poker player
 Lucas Rodriguez Pagano (born 1980), Argentine footballer
 Michele Pagano (painter) (1697–1732), Italian painter
 Michele Pagano (biochemist), biochemist and cancer biologist
 Nazario Pagano (born 1957), Italian politician
 Sarah Pagano (born 1991), American long distance runner 
 Silvio Pagano (born 1985), Italian-German footballer
 Ugo Pagano (born 1951), Italian economist and professor